Carl Heinrich Carsten Reinecke (23 June 182410 March 1910) was a German composer, conductor, and pianist in the mid-Romantic era.

Biography

Reinecke was born in what is today the Hamburg district of Altona; technically he was born a Dane, as until 1864 the town was under Danish rule. He received all his musical instruction from his father, (Johann Peter) Rudolf Reinecke (22 November 179514 August 1883), a music teacher and writer on musical subjects. Carl first devoted himself to violin-playing, but later on turned his attention to the piano. He began to compose at the age of seven, and his first public appearance as a pianist was when he was twelve years old.

At the age of 19, he undertook his first concert tour as a pianist in 1843, through Denmark and Sweden, after which he lived for a long time in Leipzig, where he studied under Felix Mendelssohn, Robert Schumann and Franz Liszt; he entered into friendly relations with the former two. After the stay in Leipzig, Reinecke went on tour with Königslöw and Wilhelm Joseph von Wasielewski (later Schumann's biographer), in North Germany and Denmark. In 1846, Reinecke was appointed Court Pianist for Christian VIII in Copenhagen. There he remained until 1848, when he resigned and went to Paris. 

Overall, he wrote four concertos for his instrument (and many cadenzas for others' works, including a large set published as his Opus 87), as well as concertos for violin, cello, harp and flute.  In the winter of 1850/51, Carl Schurz reports attending weekly "musical evenings" in Paris where Reinecke was in attendance.

In 1851, Reinecke became a professor at the Cologne Conservatory. In ensuing years he was appointed musical director in Barmen, and became the academic, musical director and conductor of the Singakademie at Breslau.

In 1860, Reinecke was appointed director of the Leipzig Gewandhaus Orchestra and professor of composition and piano at the Leipzig Conservatory. He led the orchestra for more than three decades, until 1895.  He conducted premieres such as the full seven-movement version of Brahms's A German Requiem (1869). In 1865 the Gewandhaus-Quartett premiered his piano quintet, and in 1892 his D major string quartet.

Reinecke is best known for his flute sonata "Undine", but he is also remembered as one of the most influential and versatile musicians of his time. He served as a teacher for 35 years, until his retirement in 1902. His students included Edvard Grieg, Basil Harwood, Charles Villiers Stanford, Christian Sinding, Leoš Janáček, Isaac Albéniz, August Max Fiedler, Walter Niemann, Johan Svendsen, Richard Franck, Felix Weingartner, Max Bruch, Mikalojus Konstantinas Čiurlionis, Anna Diller Starbuck, Ernest Hutcheson, Felix Fox, August Winding, Elisabeth Wintzer, Mykola Lysenko, and many others. 

After retirement from the conservatory, Reinecke devoted his time to composition, resulting in almost three hundred published works.  He wrote several operas (none of which are performed today) including König Manfred. During this time, he frequently made concert tours to England and elsewhere. His piano playing belonged to a school in which grace and neatness were characteristic, and at one time he was probably unrivaled as a Mozart player and an accompanist. In 1904 at the age of 80, he made recordings of seven works  playing on piano roll for the Welte-Mignon company, making him the earliest-born pianist to have his playing preserved in any format. He subsequently made a further 14 for the Aeolian Company's "Autograph Metrostyle" piano roll visual marking system and an additional 20 for the Hupfeld DEA reproducing piano roll system.

Reinecke died in Leipzig at age 85.

Works

 König Manfred, grand romantic opera, 1866, staged 1867
 Ein Abenteuer Händels, operetta, 1874
 Auf hohen Befehl, comic opera, 1886
 Der Gouverneur von Tours, comic opera, 1891
 Symphony No. 1 in A major, Op. 79, 1858
 Symphony No. 2 in C minor, Op. 134, 1874
 Symphony No. 3 in G minor, Op. 227, 1895
 Piano Quartet in light style, Op. 272, 1904
 Piano Quintet in A, Op. 83, 1866
 Cello Concerto in D minor, Op. 82, 1864
 Violin Concerto in G minor, Op. 141, 1876
 Harp Concerto in E minor, Op. 182 (1884)
 Flute Concerto in D major, Op. 283 (1908)
 Ballade for flute and orchestra in D minor, Op. 288 (1908) (his last opus number)
 Piano Concerto No. 1 in F-sharp minor, Op. 72, 1860
 Piano Concerto No. 2 in E minor, Op. 120,  1872
 Piano Concerto No. 3 in C major, Op. 144, 1877
 Piano Concerto No. 4 in B minor, Op. 254, 1900
 Serenade for strings in G minor, Op. 242, around 1898
 Trio for piano, oboe and horn in A minor, Op. 188, 1886
 Trio for piano, clarinet and viola in A, Op. 264
 Trio for piano, clarinet and horn in B-flat, Op. 274, 1905
 Octet for winds in B-flat, Op. 216, 1892
 Sextet for flute, oboe, clarinet, 2 horns and bassoon in B-flat, Op. 271
 Five string quartets  (Op. 16 in E-flat, 1843; Op. 30 in F, 1851; Op. 132 in C, 1874; Op. 211 in D major, 1890; and Op. 287)
 Organ Sonata, Op. 284
 Piano Sonata for the left hand, Op. 179, 1884
 String Trio in C minor, Op. 249
 Sonata for flute (Sonata Undine), Op. 167, 1882
 Sonatas for cello and piano (three, in A minor, Op. 42, 1847-8; D major, Op. 89, 1866; and G major, Op. 238, 1897, recorded on cpo)
 Three light piano trios, Op. 159a
 Piano Trio, Op. 230
 Drei Fantasiestücke für Viola und Klavier, Op. 43 (Three fantasy pieces for viola and piano)

Media

Notes

References
Carl Heinrich Carsten Reinecke Page - includes a detailed worklist

External links
 
 
Carl Reinecke String Trio Op.249, Piano Quartet Op.272, Piano Quintet Op.83 & Cello Sonata No.1 Op.42 Soundbites and discussion of works
Discussion of Reinecke string quartet No 4 in D
The Passing of Carl Reinicke, from the May, 1910, issue of "The Etude" magazine

Recordings
Piano Rolls (The Reproducing Piano Roll Foundation)
The closest approach to 19th century piano interpretation - 19th Century pianist on Welte-Mignon (ARC-106, Archiphon)

1824 births
1910 deaths
19th-century classical composers
19th-century classical pianists
19th-century German composers
19th-century conductors (music)
20th-century classical composers
20th-century classical pianists
20th-century German conductors (music)
20th-century German male musicians
20th-century German composers
Composers for harp
Composers for piano
German classical pianists
German male classical composers
German male conductors (music)
German male pianists
German opera composers
German Romantic composers
Male classical pianists
Male opera composers
People from Altona, Hamburg
Musicians from Leipzig
Pupils of Felix Mendelssohn
Pupils of Franz Liszt
Pupils of Robert Schumann
Academic staff of the University of Music and Theatre Leipzig
String quartet composers